Joe Goddard (born 12 September 1979) is a British musician, songwriter, and DJ. He is best known as a member of the English synth-pop band Hot Chip, which he co-founded with Alexis Taylor. In 2007, he co-founded record label Greco-Roman, which has produced albums by artists such as Totally Enormous Extinct Dinosaurs and Disclosure. Goddard is also a member of electronica group The 2 Bears, and produced two solo albums, Harvest Festival (2009) and Electric Lines (2017).

Career
Goddard is one of the founding members of Hot Chip. Started with school friend Alexis Taylor, they released their first album Coming on Strong in 2004. After the album's release, Hot Chip gained three new members: Owen Clarke, Felix Martin, and Al Doyle, all of whom had played on the album. Their second album, The Warning, gained the band more mainstream attention.

In 2021, Goddard teamed up with sometime Horse Meat Disco vocalist Amy Douglas to form Hard Feelings (stylised as HARD FEELINGS), a duo who aim to mix dance music with synthpop and the new wave sounds of the early 1980s, on tracks like "Holding on Too Long" and "Dangerous". The duo's debut album is also called HARD FEELINGS and was released by Domino on 5 November 2021.

Discography

References

Living people
Domino Recording Company artists
English DJs
English electronic musicians
English record producers
English songwriters
1979 births
Musicians from London
Hot Chip members
Electronic dance music DJs
Remixers